Condobolin  is a town in the west of the Central West region of New South Wales, Australia, on the Lachlan River.

History 

Prior to European settlement, the area was inhabited by the Wiradjuri people.

The name Condobolin is suggested by some to have evolved from the Aboriginal word Cundabullen – shallow crossing. The crossing was located a short distance below the junction of the Lachlan River and the Goobang Creek. Others suggest that the town's name from the Wiradjuri word for 'hop bush', or 'hop brush'.

The area was explored by John Oxley in 1817 and Thomas Mitchell in 1836.  The 'Condoublin' run was established by 1844. There had been squatters in the district since Mitchell's 1836 exploration. Closer settlement of the area began in 1880 when the large runs were broken up into smaller holdings.

The town of Condobolin was proclaimed in 1859. The railway arrived in 1898, and the town's population boomed, assisted by finds in 1885 of copper north of the town and in 1896 of gold in the district, north-west of the town. A major copper and gold mine was in operation at Condobolin from 1898 until around 1910. Agriculture is still a major influence on the town, production having expanded with the damming of the Lachlan River in 1935 by the Wyangala Dam. Wheat, barley, canola, wool, sheep and cattle are produced in the district. In more recent years irrigation has brought horticulture and cotton to the Lachlan River area.
The Lachlan River saw paddle steamer traffic from the 1860s up until the 1920s.

The video clip for Shannon Noll's first single What About Me? was filmed in Condobolin.

Heritage listings 
Condobolin has a number of heritage-listed sites, including:
 McDonnell Street: All Saints' Anglican Church, Condobolin
 Various monuments and war memorials.

Geography 
Condobolin is very close to Mount Tilga, which is said by some to be the geographical centre of New South Wales. Geosciences Australia's Bicentennial project however suggests near the Five Ways, 33 km west north west of Tottenham as one possible centre and makes no reference to Mount Tilga.

Condobolin is located at the junction of Lachlan River and Goobang Creek.

Close to Condobolin is the Overflow Station, the setting of the poem Clancy of the Overflow by Banjo Paterson.  The poem is about a Queensland drover and a sheep shearer responsible for herding large mobs of sheep long distances to market.

Climate
The area features a semi-arid climate (BSk) with hot dry summers and short, cool winters. Rainfall is spread evenly throughout the year in mild amounts. The town is very sunny, receiving 156.6 clear days annually.

Demographics
The median age was 38. 22.1% of residents reported being Aboriginal and/or Torres Strait Islander; the median age among this group was 21.

85.0% of respondents reported being born in Australia; substantially higher than the national average of 66.7%. 79.8% of residents reported having both parents born in Australia, compared to the national average of 47.3%. 88.8% of respondents spoke only English at home.

Christianity was the largest religious group in Condobolin at 78.6% of stated responses on religion. This included the denominations of Catholic (27.0%), Anglican (23.6%) and Presbyterian and Reformed (6.4%). 17.8% reported having no religion, lower than the national average of 29.6%. 10.8% of residents did not state a response to the optional question on religion.

Sport
The most popular sport in Condobolin is rugby league. The local club, the Condobolin Rams, play in the Woodbridge Cup competition, in which the club won the 2021 Premiership. Historically, the club is part of the Group 11 Rugby League district.

Condobolin formerly had a Australian rules team in the Northern Riverina League.

Events 

Condobolin is home to a two-day cross country navigational rally, known as the "Condo 750". The Condo 750 runs over a variety of private and public roads and tracks and attracts competitors from all over Australia. It is a CAMS and MA sanctioned event.

Transport
Condobolin railway station opened in 1898 and lies on the Broken Hill railway line. The station is served by the twice-weekly Indian Pacific train, as well as NSW TrainLink's Broken Hill Outback Xplorer train. This train heads to Broken Hill on Mondays (Stopping at 2:01pm) and to Sydney on Tuesdays (Stopping at 1:41pm).

Notable residents 
 Don Athaldo (born in Condobolin), strongman
 William Beech, inventor periscope rifle holder WW1.
 Kevin Gilbert, poet, author, playwright, activist
 Percy Knight, Former NSWRL Player for Balmain Tigers and Canberra Raiders
 Bill Leak, cartoonist 
 Eris O'Brien, archbishop
 Shannon Noll, singer

References

External links

Condoblin – VisitNSW

Towns in New South Wales
Towns in the Central West (New South Wales)
Lachlan Shire
Populated places established in 1859
Mining towns in New South Wales